Hidehiko Yamane (山根英彦, Yamane Hidehiko) is a Japanese clothes designer, and the man behind the popular clothing brand Evisu jeans. In March, 2006, Yamane was reported to Tokyo District Public Prosecutor's Office along with another firm on suspicion of tax evasion. Yamane and the two firms stand accused of concealing more than 500 million yen of income as well as evading some 160 million yen in taxes over three years.

He is a keen fisherman and has appeared on Japanese fishing TV.

References

External links

Year of birth missing (living people)
Living people
Japanese designers

sv:Hidehiko Yamane